Thirunelveli (pronounced Thiru-nel-veyli) is a town in Jaffna District, Sri Lanka. The name in Tamil transliterates to "God's-paddy-field." It is located about 5 km from Jaffna. This is the location of a LTTE attack that killed 13 soldiers of the Sri Lanka Army in July 1983, triggering the Sri Lankan Civil War.

See also 
Black July
List of towns in Northern Province, Sri Lanka

Towns in Jaffna District
Nallur DS Division